Barrdhubh (bar-uv) is an Irish language female given name, meaning dark headed or dark haired.

Bearers of the name

 Barrdhubh Ní Ruairc, died 1373.
 Barrdhubh Ní Findbairr, died 1418.
 Barrdhubh Ní Ruairc, died 1431.
 Barrdhubh Ní Fhialain, died 1478.
 Barrdhubh Ó Dufaigh, born 1997.

See also
List of Irish-language given names

External links
 http://medievalscotland.org/kmo/AnnalsIndex/Feminine/Aibinn.shtml

Irish-language feminine given names